A soviet republic (from ), or council republic is a republic in which the government is formed of soviets (workers' councils) and politics are based on soviet democracy.

Although the term is usually associated with Soviet member-states, it was not initially used to represent the political organisation of the Soviet Union, but merely a form of democracy.

There were several revolutionary workers' movements in various areas of Europe which declared independence under the name of a soviet republic in the immediate aftermath of the First World War.

Examples
Earliest known examples of workers' councils on a smaller scale occurred during the 1905 Russian Revolution, including the Revolution in the Kingdom of Poland (1905–1907), which spread throughout the lands of the Russian Empire; early soviets were active particularly in Central Russia and Congress Poland, where workers took over factories, districts, and sometimes even entire towns or regions before the tsarist authorities reclaimed control.

Nearing the end of the First World War, Soviet republics started appearing on a larger scale as short-lived communist revolutionary governments that were established in what had been the Russian Empire after the October Revolution and under its influence. These states included some such as the Lithuanian Soviet Socialist Republic and the Latvian Socialist Soviet Republic which won independence from Russia during the civil war period. Others such as the Ukrainian Soviet Republic and the Socialist Soviet Republic of Byelorussia later became union republics of the Soviet Union and are now independent states. Still others such as the Kuban Soviet Republic and the Bukharan People's Soviet Republic were absorbed into other polities and no longer formally exist under those names.

In the turmoil following World War I, the Russian example inspired the formation of Soviet republics in other areas of Europe including Hungary, Bavaria, Slovakia and Bremen. Soviets also appeared within towns throughout Poland, known as rady delegatów robotniczych (councils of workers' delegates), mostly throughout 1918 and 1919. One year later a Provisional Polish Revolutionary Committee was created under the patronage of Soviet Russia with the goal to establish a Soviet republic within Poland (it was later dissolved following the Red Army defeat in the Polish–Soviet War). Short-lived Irish Soviets also briefly emerged during the Irish War of Independence, most notably the Limerick Soviet. Soviet republics, most notably the Chinese Soviet Republic (Jiangxi Soviet), later appeared in China during the early stages of the Chinese Civil War. Other than these cases, "soviet republic" typically refers to the administrative republics of the Soviet Union.

See also
People's republic
Soviet (council)
Workers' council
Direct democracy
Parliamentary system
Representative democracy
Soviet democracy
Presidential system
Semi-presidential republic
:Category:Early Soviet republics
Irish soviets

References

Republic
Government of the Soviet Union
Socialism
Soviet republics
Types of democracy
Types of socialism